HBDS may stand for :
 heparin-based delivery system
 various other acronyms.

See also :
HBD, Hemoglobin subunit delta
honey bee deaths, due to colony collapse disorder